"Nobody" is a song recorded by American country music singer Dylan Scott. It was released to country radio on February 18, 2020 from his second studio album Livin' My Best Life and his fourth EP Nothing to Do Town. The song was written by Scott, Dallas Wilson, Matt Alderman and produced by Matt Alderman, Curt Gibbs and Jim Ed Norman.

Content
Scott shared the idea for the song: "writing 'Nobody' was basically an idea my co-writer brought to me and fit my life perfectly, it's exactly how I feel about my wife and something I've said to her before, 'Nobody is gonna love you like I do.'"

Music video
The music video was released on December 18, 2020. It included his wife Blair Robinson and his two kids – Beckett Scott and Finley Gray. First the couple went into theater, which placed dozens of lit candles, then Scott played the piano at this, and played pictures of their nuptials on the screen.

Charts

Weekly charts

Year-end charts

Certifications

References

2020 singles
2020 songs
Dylan Scott songs
Songs written by Dylan Scott
Song recordings produced by Jim Ed Norman
Curb Records singles